Asha-Kos Mohamud Omar is a Somali politician who is a member of the Federal Parliament of Somalia.

See also 
 List of members of the Federal Parliament of Somalia

References 

21st-century Somalian women politicians
21st-century Somalian politicians
Living people
Somaliland women in politics
Year of birth missing (living people)